"The Dripping Tap" is a song by Australian psychedelic rock band King Gizzard & the Lizard Wizard, released in 2022 as the first single from their twentieth studio album, Omnium Gatherum. Over 18 minutes in length, the song was first composed during studio sessions for Fishing for Fishies and re-recorded with all band members present following a period of remote collaboration during COVID-19 lockdowns.

Recording 
While the song was first released on Omnium Gatherum, an early version of the song was first played during the Fishing for Fishies sessions, the song would be scrapped until after COVID-19 lockdowns were lifted, when the song was re-recorded and finished with all band members present. The band recorded an extended jam and then edited the best segments into the completed song.

Composition 
The song is over 18 minutes in length. Guitar World described it as featuring "drop D, Mixolydian guitar madness set to an irresistible motorik beat (complete with wailing harmonica)". Stereogum described it as "a kosmische rave-up punctuated by soulful outbursts worthy of Hall & Oates" inspired by Krautrock groups such as Can.

Critical reception
Abby Jones of Consequence stated that "The Dripping Tap" "exemplifies that renewed sense of inspiration King Gizzard felt upon returning to the studio."

Personnel
 Lucas Harwood – bass
 Michael Cavanagh – drums 
 Cook Craig – guitar, vocals 
 Joey Walker – guitar
 Stu Mackenzie – vocals, guitar, bass, organ, piano, percussion
 Ambrose Kenny-Smith – vocals, organ, percussion, electric piano, harmonica

Charts

References

External links 

 "The Dripping Tap" on YouTube

2022 singles
2022 songs
King Gizzard & The Lizard Wizard songs